Yosvani Kessel (born 24 February 1977) is a Cuban judoka. He competed in the men's half-heavyweight event at the 2000 Summer Olympics.

References

1977 births
Living people
Cuban male judoka
Olympic judoka of Cuba
Judoka at the 2000 Summer Olympics
Place of birth missing (living people)
Pan American Games medalists in judo
Pan American Games silver medalists for Cuba
Judoka at the 1999 Pan American Games
Medalists at the 1999 Pan American Games
20th-century Cuban people
21st-century Cuban people